Stockholm is the capital of Sweden and can refer to the city proper, as well as several different geographical and administrative divisions in and around the city: 
 Stockholm City Centre
 Stockholm Municipality (City of Stockholm)
 Stockholm County, the county containing the city of Stockholm
 Metropolitan Stockholm, a metropolitan area consisting of municipalities within the county
 Stockholm urban area, the central urban area of Metropolitan Stockholm
 Stockholm (National Area), a European Union statistical region

Stockholm may also refer to:

Places

Canada 
 Stockholm, Saskatchewan

Papua New Guinea 
 Stockholm Airport (Papua New Guinea)

Sweden 
 Stockholm, a small village in Ronneby Municipality, Blekinge County
 Stockholm, a small village in Perstorp Municipality, Skåne County

United States
 Stockholm Township, Crawford County, Iowa
 Stockholm, Maine
 Stockholm, Minnesota
 Stockholm Township, Minnesota
 Stockholm, New Jersey
 Stockholm, New York
 Stockholm, South Dakota
 Stockholm, Wisconsin
 Stockholm (town), Wisconsin
 Bridgeport, New Jersey, formerly known as New Stockholm

Ships
 SS Stockholm, an ocean liner used by the Swedish American Line 1915–1928
 MS Stockholm (1938), an ocean liner ordered by the Swedish American Line but destroyed in a fire before being completed
 MS Stockholm (1941), an ocean liner of the same design as above, completed for the Swedish American Line but sold to the Italian government, becoming a troopship
 MS Stockholm (1948), an ocean liner used by the Swedish American Line 1948–1959; collided with the SS Andrea Doria in 1956; as of 2020 sailing as MV Astoria
 , several ships of the Swedish Navy
 Stockholm-class corvette

Arts and entertainment

Film
 Stockholm (2013 film), a 2013 Spanish film
 Stockholm (2018 film), a 2018 Swedish-Canadian film
 Stockholm, Pennsylvania, 2015 American film

Music
 Stockholm Monsters, an English post-punk band
 Stockholm Records, a Swedish record label
 Stockholm (Jean-Louis Aubert album), 1997
 Stockholm (The Triffids album), 1990
 Stockholm (Chrissie Hynde album), 2014
 Stockholm & Göteborg, a 2008 album by Henry Cow
 "Stockholm" (instrumental), an instrumental composition released by Lawrence Welk and His Orchestra in 1964
 "Stockholm" (song), a 1992 single released by Orup
 "Stockholm", a single by the UK indie rock band New Fast Automatic Daffodils
 "Stockholm", a song by Benjamin Ingrosso from En gång i tiden (del 2)

Other uses
 Stockholm Convention, an international agreement on reducing persistent organic pesticides
 Stockholm format, a text-based multiple sequence alignment format
 Stockholm syndrome, a psychological phenomenon
 Stockholm tar, a waterproofing agent and veterinary topical medicine
 Stockholm City (newspaper), a former free daily newspaper